AADNEVIK (stylized in caps) is a British luxury fashion brand. The brand provides haute couture, ready-to-wear clothes, bridal clothing, loungewear and fashion accessories. It was founded in 2013 by Hila and Kristian Aadnevik, and is based in Knightsbridge, London.

History 
London-based Norwegian fashion designer Kristian Aadnevik had established a self-titled label in 2004, which is a different brand from AADNEVIK. Kristian stopped operating the "Kristian Aadnevik" brand in 2013 and opened the new brand "Aadnevik" when he met his wife Hila. The couple met in London in 2012, where Kristian was studying womenswear at the Royal College of Art. Hila is a self-taught designer.

Their first collection was titled "Moth" and was inspired by the appearance of the moth and its cocoon.

The label has been featured at London Fashion Week several times. At London Fashion Week 2019, Aadnevik unveiled a collection inspired by Leo Tolstoy’s novel Anna Karenina.

In October 2020, the National Museum in Oslo, Norway purchased one of the brand’s designs for its fashion collection, which went on display in Spring 2021.  In 2020, the brand announced its luxury loungewear line.

AADNEVIK has designed and provided clothing for celebrities such as Beyonce, Madonna, Kendall Jenner, Halle Berry, and international celebrities such as Ananya Panday, Malaika Arora, Anushka Sharma, and Priyanka Chopra.  One of AADNEVIK's designs was worn by Selena Gomez in her music video for the song "Come and Get It", and another in the "Rare" video.

In September 2022, AADNEVIK presented at the London Fashion Week.  The brand’s 2022 Autumn/Winter collection was titled “Wolf Moon” and was inspired by Norse mythology.

AADNEVIK was also featured in the 72nd issue of London Runway magazine, which was published in 2022.

Models such as Marianne Fonseca, Amelia Gray Hamlin, and Maya Henry have walked the catwalk for AADNEVIK.

References 

Haute couture
High fashion brands
Fashion accessory brands
Clothing companies established in 2013
Design companies established in 2013
British companies established in 2013